Charles Luylier (born 5 January 1989 in Angers, France), is a French broadcast journalist.

Career 
Luylier came to public attention participating in televised debates, for example on Le Nouveau Journal on Direct 8. He once anchored Voyage au Bout de la Nuit on that network.

He then joined the team at Radio Lazer in Guichen. A year after that, in 2012, he joined RCF Email Limousin, where he presented the morning regional news. In September 2014, he worked at Radio FreeDom.

On 29 July 2015, he was the first journalist to reach the beach when the MH370 wing part was recovered at Saint André (Reunion Island).

On 19 November 2015, six days after the Paris terrorist attacks, Luylier talked with Patrice Grondin, a witness to the GIPN assault at Saint Denis, for six hours.

During the 2018 World Cup, he debated Zoé Lacaille every day about the French soccer team; Lacaille supported France and Luylier was willingly opposed to her point of view.

References

Clicanoo - Journal de l'île de la Réunion, actualités, vidéos, sport, offre d'emploi, annonces.

1989 births
Living people
French radio journalists
French radio presenters
French male non-fiction writers